Gold Chain Cowboy is the third studio album by American country music singer Parker McCollum. It was released through MCA Nashville on July 30, 2021.

Content
Gold Chain Cowboy was confirmed for release in mid-2021. The album consists of ten songs, all of which McCollum co-wrote. Prior to the album's release, "Pretty Heart" and "To Be Loved by You" were both issued as singles. Jon Randall produced the album.

Critical reception
Markos Papadatos of Digital Journal rated the album 4.5 out of 5 stars, stating that "There is a rawness and honesty to McCollum’s music. This album will resonate well with both fans of neotraditional and modern country."

Track listing

Personnel
Adapted from liner notes.

Musicians
Stanton Adcock - acoustic guitar (track 7), electric guitar (tracks 3, 7)
Jessi Alexander - background vocals (track 6)
Doug Belote - drums (tracks 3, 4, 6, 7), percussion (tracks 4, 7)
Danielle Bradbery - featured vocals (track 2)
John Cowan - background vocals (tracks 3, 4)
Dan Dugmore - pedal steel guitar (track 4)
Shani Gandhi - keyboards (track 4), background vocals (track 4)
Jedd Hughes - acoustic guitar (tracks 2, 4-6, 8, 9), electric guitar (tracks 5, 6)
Tony Lucido - bass guitar (tracks 1, 10), gang vocals (track 10)
Parker McCollum - harmonica (track 8), lead vocals (all tracks)
Rob McNelley - acoustic guitar (track 10), electric guitar (all tracks except 10), gang vocals (track 10)
Alena Moran - gang vocals (track 10)
Lex Price - bass guitar (tracks 3, 4, 7)
Jon Randall - electric guitar (track 6), background vocals (tracks 1, 3-5, 7, 9, 10)
Jerry Roe - bass guitar (tracks 2, 5, 8, 9), drums (tracks 1, 2, 5, 8-10), percussion (tracks 1, 2, 8-10), gang vocals (track 10)
Marc Rogers - bass guitar (track 6)
F. Reid Shippen - programming (track 5)
Bryan Sutton - acoustic guitar (tracks 1, 10), mandolin (track 1), gang vocals (track 10)
Jimmy Wallace - Hammond B-3 organ (tracks 1, 2), keyboards (all tracks), gang vocals (track 10)
Brian Wright - gang vocals (track 10)

Production
Jon Randall - producer
F. Reid Shippen - engineer, mixing
Brandon Bell - engineer, digital editing
Shani Gandhi - additional engineering, digital editing
Michael Mechling - assistant engineering, digital editing
Lowel Reynolds - assistant engineering
Ethan Barrette - assistant engineering
Alena Moran - production coordination
Pete Lyman - mastering

Artwork
Parker McCollum - art direction
Tyler Conrad - cover design and photography
Craig Allen - design
Kera Jackson - art production

Charts

Weekly charts

Year-end charts

References

2021 albums
Parker McCollum albums
MCA Records albums
Albums produced by Jon Randall